Eisentraut's shrew (Crocidura eisentrauti) is a species of mammal in the family Soricidae. It is endemic to Cameroon.  Its natural habitat is subtropical or tropical high-elevation grassland.

References

 Hutterer, R. & Howell, K. 2004.  Crocidura eisentrauti.   2006 IUCN Red List of Threatened Species.   Downloaded on 30 July 2007.

Eisentraut's shrew
Mammals of Cameroon
Endemic fauna of Cameroon
Eisentraut's shrew
Taxonomy articles created by Polbot
Fauna of the Cameroonian Highlands forests
Taxa named by Henri Heim de Balsac